Annuloplatidia is a genus of brachiopods belonging to the family Platidiidae.

The species of this genus are found in Northern America.

Species:

Annuloplatidia annulata 
Annuloplatidia curiosa 
Annuloplatidia horni 
Annuloplatidia indopacifica 
Annuloplatidia richeri

References

Brachiopod genera